Imagining Argentina is a 2003 drama historical film written and directed by British playwright Christopher Hampton and starring Antonio Banderas, Emma Thompson, Leticia Dolera and Rubén Blades. It is based on the award-winning eponymous 1987 novel by American writer Lawrence Thornton. It was nominated for the Golden Lion at the 2003 Venice Film Festival.

The film is centered on a couple living through the oppressive last military dictatorship in Argentina (1976-1983) and the Dirty War it conducted. Graphic images of suffering, such as rape and torture, are depicted. The closing caption states that a total of nearly 30,000 Argentines were "disappeared" through this period. The film was a joint USA/Argentina/Spain/UK production.

Plot synopsis 
During the last civil-military dictatorship in Argentina, the military government conducts what was known as a Dirty War against opponents, abducting and often murdering those opposed to its rule. Cecilia, a dissident journalist living in Buenos Aires, is kidnapped by the secret police to join the ranks of the disappeared. She had earlier published a challenging article in her outrage over the forced disappearance of students protesting the bus fares.

As her husband Carlos, a theatre director, begins to search frantically for her, he realizes that he has acquired psychic power that enables him to predict the future. Carlos is sought after by others who have lost loved ones. This power helps Carlos foresee what happens to his wife and other detainees. At one point, Carlos visits the Naval Mechanics School, revealed as a notorious center of torture and murder of detainees.

Cast 
 Antonio Banderas as Carlos Rueda
 Emma Thompson as Cecilia Rueda
 Leticia Dolera as Teresa Rueda, Carlos and Cecilia's daughter
 Maria Canals as Esme Palomares
 Rubén Blades as Silvio Ayala
 Mariana Seligmann as Guzman Tochter
 Irene Escolar as Eurydice
 Andreas Tang as himself
 Kuno Becker as Gustavo Santos, a warden
 Anton Lesser as General Guzmán
 Marzenka Novak as Sasha

Reception 
Review aggregation website Rotten Tomatoes gives the film an approval rating of 31% based on reviews from 13 critics, with an average rating of 4.30/10. Metacritic calculated an average score of 27 out of 100 based on 4 reviews, indicating "generally unfavorable reviews".

Peter Bradshaw for The Guardian wrote:"well, what can I say about something destined to be a cult classic of awfulness? Imagining Argentina is an excruciatingly misjudged attempt to impose a layer of occult spirituality on an important political subject... The spectacle of Banderas exercising his sensitive magic powers, intercut with Thompson getting horribly raped and beaten - with close-ups on her droll, quizzical face contorted in agony - is truly wince-making".

References

External links 
 Official Site
 
 
 
 Dutch FilmWorks B.V. (in Dutch)

2003 films
2003 drama films
Dirty War films
Films scored by George Fenton
Films about Latin American military dictatorships
Spanish films based on actual events
Films based on American novels
Films directed by Christopher Hampton
Films shot in Buenos Aires
Films shot in Madrid
Enforced disappearance
American independent films
Political drama films
British independent films
Spanish independent films
English-language Spanish films
Films shot in Almería
2000s English-language films
American films based on actual events
British films based on actual events
2000s American films
2000s British films